Horwood may refer to:

Places
Horwood, Devon, a village in Devon, England
Horwood, Lovacott and Newton Tracey, a civil parish in Devon, England
Horwood, Newfoundland and Labrador, a community in Newfoundland and Labrador, Canada
Great Horwood and Little Horwood, villages and civil parishes in Buckinghamshire, England

Other uses
Horwood (surname)
Horwood Bagshaw, an Australian manufacturing company